Li Weimiao (Chinese: 李惟淼; born 31 March 1950) is a Chinese former footballer and commentator. He played for Beijing throughout his career as well as representing China in the 1976 Asian Cup.

Playing career
Li Weimiao started his career playing for the Beijing football team in 1972. He representing Beijing win the runner up of football at China 1975 National Games of China. Li was called up to the Chinese national team and played within the 1976 Asian Cup. In 1981, Li retired from football and began to study in Beijing Sports University until 1983 . He began to work as commentator from 1995.

Honours 
Beijing
 China national league: 1973

References

External links
Team China Stats

1950 births
Living people
Chinese footballers
Footballers from Shanghai
Beijing Guoan F.C. players
China international footballers
1976 AFC Asian Cup players
Chinese association football commentators
Association football forwards